A ram air turbine (RAT) is a small wind turbine that is connected to a hydraulic pump, or  electrical generator, installed in an aircraft and used as a power source. The RAT generates power from the airstream by ram pressure due to the speed of the aircraft. It may be called an air driven generator (ADG) on some aircraft.

Operation
Modern aircraft generally use RATs only in an emergency. In case of the loss of both primary and auxiliary power sources the RAT will power vital systems (flight controls, linked hydraulics and also flight-critical instrumentation). Some RATs produce only hydraulic power, which is in turn used to power electrical generators. 

In some early aircraft (including airships), small RATs were permanently mounted and operated a small electrical generator or fuel pump. Some constant-speed propellers, such as those of the Argus As 410 engines used in the Focke-Wulf Fw 189, used a propeller turbine on the spinner to power a self-contained pitch governor controlling this constant speed.

Modern aircraft generate power in the main engines or an additional fuel-burning turbine engine called an auxiliary power unit, which is often mounted in the rear of the fuselage or in the main-wheel well. The RAT generates power from the airstream due to the speed of the aircraft. If aircraft speeds are low, the RAT will produce less power. In normal conditions the RAT is retracted into the fuselage (or wing), and is deployed manually or automatically following complete loss of power. In the time between power loss and RAT deployment, batteries are used.

Military use

RATs are common in military aircraft which must be capable of surviving sudden and complete loss of power. 

In other military uses, pod-fitted systems such as the M61A1 Vulcan cannon or high-powered electronics such as the AN/ALQ-99 jamming system can be powered by a RAT in standard operation. This allows their installation on a standard hardpoint, without requiring a pod-specific power supply. Also, some free-fall nuclear weapons, such as the British Yellow Sun and Red Beard, used RATs to power radar altimeters and firing circuits; these were a more reliable alternative to batteries.

Civilian use 
Many modern types of commercial airliners, from the Vickers VC10 of the 1960s, are equipped with RATs. A ram air turbine driving an electrical generator was chosen for the VC10 because of its use of "packaged" hydraulically-powered flying controls, rather than a centralised hydraulic system. The individual package units of the VC10 were each powered electrically and so emergency redundancy for the VC10 relied on quadruple generators and a backup RAT generator at a time when most RATs drove hydraulic pumps.

A typical large RAT on a commercial aircraft can be capable of producing , depending on the generator. Smaller, low airspeed models may generate as little as 400 watts.

RATs have also been used to power centrifugal pumps to pressurize the spray systems on aircraft that are used as crop dusters to deliver liquid agents to cropland. The major reason for choosing a RAT is safety; using a RAT in the United States allows an FAA-certified engine and power systems on the aircraft to remain unmodified. There is no need to use an engine power takeoff to drive the pump, as the pump can be placed low or below the exterior of the airframe, greatly simplifying plumbing. Being the lowest point in the plumbing, it will have gravity feed from the spray tanks and never need to be primed. In the event of a pump failure that could result in seizure, there is no effect on the flying ability of the aircraft or its systems apart from the fact that the spray systems are non-functional.

Civilian incidents involving RAT deployment 
The following aviation incidents involved the deployment of a ram air turbine:
 1974: British Airways Flight 910
 1983: Air Canada Flight 143, also known as the Gimli Glider incident
 1996: The hijacking of Ethiopian Airlines Flight 961
 2000: Hapag-Lloyd Flight 3378
 2001: Air Transat Flight 236, also known as the Azores Glider incident
 2004: Pinnacle Airlines Flight 3701
 2009: US Airways Flight 1549
 2010: Cathay Pacific Flight 780
 2016: Air Canada Flight 361
 2018: SmartLynx Estonia Flight 9001
 2020: Pakistan International Airlines Flight 8303
 2022: LATAM Paraguay Flight 1325

References

External links

A survey on the use of ram air turbine in aircraft / AIP Conference Proceedings > Volume 1831, Issue 1 (2017) doi:10.1063/1.4981189
 Emergency Airplane RATs – IEEE

Electrical generators
Aircraft components